Mick Kelly (born 16 November 1952) is  a former Australian rules footballer who played with Footscray in the Victorian Football League (VFL).

Notes

External links 		
		
		
		
		
		
		
Living people		
1952 births		
		
Australian rules footballers from Victoria (Australia)		
Western Bulldogs players
Williamstown Football Club players